Nehemiah Pritchett (born February 11) is an American football cornerback for the Auburn Tigers.

High school career 
Pritchett attended Jackson High School in Jackson, Alabama. During his senior season, Pritchett recorded 40 tackles, six interceptions, and two tackles for a loss, along with eight offensive touchdowns. He was named to the Alabama High School All-Star roster in 2018. A three-star recruit, Pritchett committed to play college football at Auburn University over offers from Minnesota, Nebraska, and Ole Miss.

College career 
Pritchett tallied 93 tackles, one sack, and two interceptions over the course of four seasons. Hes tarted every game in the 2022 season, finishing with 37 tackles, eight pass deflections, and a forced fumble. In 2021, he scored an 80-yard touchdown on a blocked field goal. Pritchett announced that he would return to Auburn for another season in 2023 rather than enter the 2023 NFL Draft.

References

External links 

 Auburn Tigers bio

Living people
African-American players of American football
Auburn Tigers football players
Players of American football from Alabama
Year of birth missing (living people)